Abaseen Yousafzai (Pashto) is a Pakistani Pashto and Urdu language poet. He is the chairman of Pashto Department in Islamia College Peshawar. Yousafzai has had his poetry published across the Durand Line. Abaseen Yousafzai joined the Islamia College Peshawar as a lecturer of Pashto in 1993.

Works
Yousafzai has written three poetry collections: Ghurzanguna (1994),  Alwat (2005), and Maraam  (2016). Ghurzanguna ran to ten editions and Alwat to five editions. Yousafzai was given a book launch ceremony from the Abasin Arts Council for Alwat. His book, Da Pakhtunkhwa Bani, is a biography of Malek Ahmad Baba, who founded the State of Pakhtunkhwa in 1520. Yousafzai conducted research on the concept of nationalism in Pashto poetry. The title of the thesis was "Concept of nationality in the poetry of Hamza Shinwari".

Literary services and contributions
Dr. Abaseen Yousafzai is a widely recognized Pashto poet, research scholar, literary critic, and column writer in addition to being a noted radio and TV anchor -person. He was born in district Lower Dir, village Khanpur in 1964. He did his LLB from Peshawar University in 1986 and Master in Pashto literature in 1988 with distinction. He did his Ph. D in Pashto in 2016. He is the author of ten books of Pashto and Urdu and is the recipient of about 400 Shields/awards for outstanding literary and social services. He has been given presidential award by the Government of Afghanistan  for his literary contribution to Pashto literature, and won best teacher award from Teaching Staff Association of Islamia College University Peshawar last year. Dr. Abaseen Yousafzai has also been awarded Pride of Performance (Presidential Award) in recognition of his excellence performance in the field of “ Poetry, Column, Research & Criticism, TV, Radio, Stage Anchor and Cultural Activist”.

He has been contributing Pashto language and literature for the last 40 years, regularly along with different Pashto and Urdu newspapers, literary magazines and radio and TV shows. Being a charismatic personality, Abaseen Yousafzai remains an integral part of most of literary event across Khyber Pakhtunkhwa, Ex-FATA and throughout the country. He has contributed his critical and research treatises on numerous Pashto and Urdu journals on variety of topics. He has also written forewords to around 200 Pashto and Urdu books.

Dr. Abaseen Yousafzai has been actively participating in a large number of literary and research seminars, workshops, conferences and poetry sessions in a distinguished position in several foreign countries. He has launched his teaching career at the historic Islamia College, Peshawar (now university) since 1993 and currently working as the Head Department of Pashto and also is In-charge of historic Khyber Union of the Islamia College University Peshawar. Being chief organizer of the Student’s societies, he has been grooming hundreds of young students by involving them in literary and cultural activities.

Three Pashto poetry books published: Ghurzangoona (First Pashto poetry collection, Pub-1994). This collection enjoys a unique distinction of having published for over ten times and broke all previous records in the history of Pashto literature. Alwat (Pashto poetry volume, Pub: 2005). Published five times and has broken record of the bestselling books in the market. Both Ghurzangoona and Alwat poetry collections are recipient of numerous literary awards and commendation certificates. Maraam (Pashto poetry collection, Pub: 2016)

Seven prose books: Ruhnama (Translation in Pashto, Pub: 2002), Zaitoon Bano Fun aur Shakhsiat (Urdu, Pub: 2008), Khutbaate Imam Khataab (Pashto translation, Pub: 2010), Sadako’s prayer (Pashto translation, Pub: 2012), Understanding Fata, (Pashto translation, Pub: 2012), Da Pakhtunkhwa Baani (Pashto profile, Pub: 2016), Pakhtun Hamza (Pashto research published 2019).
Dr. Abaseen Yousafzai has recently accomplished a gigantic task of Pashto syllabus from KG to 12th grades under the auspices of Khyber Pakhtunkhwa Directorate of Curriculum and Teacher Education (DCTE). He has anchored popular Pashto and Urdu shows including Wagme, Trang, Yadgerana, Ghazalzar and Shar-e- Insaniat on the State run radio and TV. He has written scripts and conducted various literary, social, cultural, and informative programmes for PTV-Home, PTV-2, PTV National, PTV NEWS, some private TV and FM radios -101 of Khyber Pakhtunkhwa.

Yousafzai has completed numerous literary, research, and cultural projects with Khyber Pakhtunkhwa Culture Directorate. He is affiliated with hundreds of literary, cultural, social and humanitarian organizations and also supervising large number of young men and women in pursuing their literary, cultural, and research studies.

References

Living people
Pashto-language writers
Pashto-language poets
Pashtun people
Pakistani male poets
1964 births